Medhai is a 2012 Indian Tamil-language action drama film directed by debutant director Saravanan and produced by Kalaimagal Kalaikoodam. The film stars Ramarajan, Kaushika, Haasini and Charle. The music was composed by Dhina. The film released on 15 January 2012.

Plot

Cast
Ramarajan as Saravana
Kaushika
Haasini as Saravana's sister
Charle
Raj Kapoor
K. Natraj
Vijay Krishnaraj
Alex
Kovai Senthil
Ganja Karuppu
Pandu
Muthukaalai

Production
Medhai marked the acting comeback of Ramarajan after many years and it was his 44th film as an actor. The film marked the directorial debut of Saravanan who earlier apprenticed with Senthilnathan and Hari.

Soundtrack
The soundtrack was composed by Dhina. The audio release of the film was held on 17 July 2010 at Chennai.

Reception
A critic from Behindwoods wrote "Medhai is quite obviously built around Ramarajan and his comeback. One only wishes the film had got a more contemporary story, treatment and better technical aspects. Director MTG Saravana definitely had to pay more attention to all aspects of the movie". A critic from The New Indian Express wrote "The film is neither too exciting, nor a great disappointment. Only, the whole feel is that of a decades old film".

References

2012 films
2010s Tamil-language films
Indian action drama films
2012 directorial debut films
2012 action drama films